Russian Central Studio of Documentary Film is a Russian film studio, founded in 1927. It was the largest Soviet newsreel and documentary cinematography studio. It is headquartered in Moscow.

History
Studio traced its history from 1927, when a special newsreel division of Sovkino was formed. In 1931 it was reorganized into All-Union Newsreel Factory. Since 1936 known as Moscow Newsreel Studio, and since 1940 as Central Newsreel Studio.

From 1944 until 1993, it was known as Central Studio for Documentary Film or CSDF.

In Soviet Union, the CSDF was responsible for some newsreel series, like:
 News of the Day / "Новости дня",
 Foreign Newsreel / "Иностранная кинохроника",
 Soviet Sports / "Советский спорт",
 Soviet Cinema / "Советское кино",
 Pioneria / "Пионерия"

In 1944–1946 the studio director was Sergei Gerasimov. The studio produced a number of documentary films about the Great Patriotic War, including Moscow Strikes Back, winner of the 1942 Academy Award for Best Documentary.

Filmography 
 Secret and Explicit (The Aims and Acts of Zionists)
 Pobeda na Pravoberezhnoi Ukraine i izgnaniye nemetsikh zakhvatchikov za predeli Ukrainskikh sovetskikh zemel (1945)
 The City That Stopped Hitler: Heroic Stalingrad
 Stalingrad (1943)
 Bitva za nashu Sovetskuyu Ukrainu (1943)
 Narodniye mstiteli (1943)
 Den voyny (1942)
 Den novogo mira (1940)

References

External links 

Central Studio for Documentary Films – Film Catalogue // Net-Film – Newsreels and documentary films Archive
 Official site RCSDF 

Film production companies of Russia
Film production companies of the Soviet Union
Companies based in Moscow
Russian film studios
Documentary film production companies
Mass media companies established in 1927
1927 establishments in Russia
State-owned film companies